Cham Zereshk is a village in Lorestan Province, Iran.

Cham Zereshk may also refer to:
Cham Zereshk-e Choqavian Gol Morad
Cham Zereshk-e Esperi
Cham Zereshk-e Olya
Cham Zereshk-e Sofla